Botnik Studios is an entertainment group developed to exhibit work created by the Botnik community, a writer's society of artists and developers who incorporate technology in the creation of comedy. This content is published on the Botnik homepage.

Features

Botnik's main tool is a predictive text keyboard, similar to one used by a smartphone. It offers options of words to type based on what has been previously entered, meaning that if the tool has analyzed a body of text it will find combinations of words likely to be used by a particular author whose text has been 'scraped' by the system.

The result generally sounds almost authentic in that it is recognizable but ridiculous enough to be considered funny by readers.

History

The program was developed by Jamie Brew, a former Clickhole and The Onion writer, and Bob Mankoff, who is humor editor at Esquire and former cartoon editor of The New Yorker. In August 2017 they were joined by computational scientist Elle O'Brien and creative developer Joseph Parker. Brew and O'Brien are based in Seattle and Mankoff and Parker work in New York.

In 2017 Botnik began referring to themselves as an open community, meaning Botnik users can download the predictive keypad, experiment with the tool and display their outcomes on the community page of the Botnik website. In July of that year they received a grant from the Amazon/Techstars Accelerator Program thanks to being a startup whose technology could realistically improve Amazon's smart speaker assistant, Alexa.

Botnik became better known when Zach Braff, the actor who plays J.D. on the medical comedy series Scrubs, shared a recording of himself reading a Scrubs-style monologue written by the Botnik system in December 2017.

Botnik's Harry Potter and the Portrait of What Looked Like a Large Pile of Ash was ranked number four in the list of ten best internet moments in 2017 by The Guardian.

References

External links 

 

American companies established in 2016
American comedy websites
Companies based in Seattle
Internet properties established in 2016